{{DISPLAYTITLE:Kappa1 Apodis}}

Kappa1 Apodis, Latinized from κ1 Apodis, is the Bayer designation for a binary star system in the southern circumpolar constellation of Apus. The combined apparent visual magnitude of the system is 5.52, indicating that this is a faint, naked eye star that can be viewed in dark suburban skies. It is moving away from the Sun with a radial velocity of +62 km/s.

This is a spectroscopic binary system with an orbital period of 0.6 days. The combined spectrum matches a stellar classification of B1npe. The 'e' suffix indicates that this is a Be star with emission lines in the spectrum. An 'n' means that the absorption lines in the spectrum are broadened from the Doppler effect as a result of rapid rotation. Finally, the 'p' shows some peculiarity in the spectrum. It is classified as a Gamma Cassiopeiae type variable star and its brightness varies from magnitude +5.43 to +5.61.

Because it is a binary star system, it was most likely not turned into a runaway system as the result of a supernova explosion. A companion star is a 12th magnitude orange K-type subgiant located at an angular separation of 27 arcseconds.

See also
 Kappa² Apodis

References

External links
 Image κ¹ Apodis

B-type subgiants
K-type subgiants
Be stars
Gamma Cassiopeiae variable stars
Runaway stars
Spectroscopic binaries

137387
Apus (constellation)
Apodis, Kappa1
CD-72 01139
076013
5730